Glyphipterix orthomacha is a species of sedge moth in the genus Glyphipterix. It was described by Edward Meyrick in 1920. It is found in Australia, including Queensland.

References

Moths described in 1920
Glyphipterigidae
Moths of Australia